Jennifer Williams (born 11 October 2005) is a Swedish artistic gymnast. She represented Sweden at the inaugural junior World Championships. She is a three-time Nordic junior champion.

Early life
Williams was born in Spånga, Sweden.

Gymnastics career

Junior

2018
Williams competed at the Unni & Haralds Trophy where she placed sixth in the all-around and fifth on the uneven bars.  As a result she was selected to represent Sweden at the 2018 Nordic Championships.  While there she helped Sweden place second.  Individually she placed fifteenth in the all-around but won gold on the balance beam.  Williams ended the season competing at her first Swedish Championships.  She placed fifth in the all-around and second on balance beam behind Tonya Paulsson.

2019
Williams competed at the Nordic Championships she helped Sweden place third.  Individually she placed third in the all-around behind Camille Rasmussen and Maisa Kuusikko but won gold on uneven bars and floor exercise.  Williams was selected to represent Sweden at the inaugural Junior World Championships.  She finished 25th in the all-around.  Williams ended the season competing at the European Youth Olympic Festival where she helped Sweden finish 16th as a team.

Senior

2021
Williams turned senior in 2021 and competed at the European Championships.  She only competed on balance beam and placed 36th during qualification.  She next competed at the Osijek Challenge Cup where she qualified to the floor exercise final and placed fifth.  In September Williams was selected to compete at the World Championships alongside Nathalie Westlund and Tonya Paulsson.

Competitive history

References

External links
 

2005 births
Living people
Swedish female artistic gymnasts
Sportspeople from Stockholm
21st-century Swedish women